Paul Pen is a Spanish author of literary fiction, thriller and suspense. His first novel, El aviso, earned him the title of Fnac New Talent in 2011  and has been translated into German, Italian and English. This debut was described as "outstanding" by Babelia, the cultural section of Spanish newspaper El País. In 2013, he released his second novel, El brillo de las luciérnagas (Plaza y Janés), published in English by AmazonCrossing in April 2016, translated by Simon Bruni. He has also published some fifteen short stories, some of them appearing in men's magazines such as NOX and Don. In 2017, his third novel La casa entre los cactus (Desert Flowers) was published internationally in many languages, as it happened in 2019 with his subsequent novel Un matrimonio perfecto (Under the Water).

Film and TV 
Most of Pen's novels are being or have been adapted for the big screen. The film adaptation of his first novel El aviso was released on Netflix in July 2018 as The Warning. Jorge Guerricaechevarría penned the Spanish script with revisions by Chris Sparling and Chris Rossi.

The House Among the Cactuses, with the screenplay written by Paul Pen himself, will premiere in September 2022.

In his capacity as scriptwriter, Paul Pen also collaborated in the supernatural thriller The Girl in the Mirror.

Bibliography

Novels

Short stories

Collections

 Trece historias (2015)

References

External links 
 Official web 

Spanish male novelists
1979 births
Living people
21st-century Spanish novelists
21st-century Spanish male writers